The arrondissement of Compiègne is an arrondissement of France in the Oise department in the Hauts-de-France region. It has 156 communes.

Composition

The communes of the arrondissement of Compiègne are:

 Amy (60011)
 Antheuil-Portes (60019)
 Appilly (60021)
 Armancourt (60023)
 Arsy (60024)
 Attichy (60025)
 Autrêches (60032)
 Avricourt (60035)
 Babœuf (60037)
 Bailly (60043)
 Baugy (60048)
 Beaugies-sous-Bois (60052)
 Beaulieu-les-Fontaines (60053)
 Beaurains-lès-Noyon (60055)
 Béhéricourt (60059)
 Belloy (60061)
 Berlancourt (60062)
 Berneuil-sur-Aisne (60064)
 Bienville (60070)
 Biermont (60071)
 Bitry (60072)
 Boulogne-la-Grasse (60093)
 Braisnes-sur-Aronde (60099)
 Brétigny (60105)
 Bussy (60117)
 Caisnes (60118)
 Cambronne-lès-Ribécourt (60119)
 Campagne (60121)
 Candor (60124)
 Canly (60125)
 Cannectancourt (60126)
 Canny-sur-Matz (60127)
 Carlepont (60129)
 Catigny (60132)
 Chelles (60145)
 Chevincourt (60147)
 Chevrières (60149)
 Chiry-Ourscamp (60150)
 Choisy-au-Bac (60151)
 Clairoix (60156)
 Compiègne (60159)
 Conchy-les-Pots (60160)
 Coudun (60166)
 Couloisy (60167)
 Courtieux (60171)
 Crapeaumesnil (60174)
 Crisolles (60181)
 Croutoy (60184)
 Cuise-la-Motte (60188)
 Cuts (60189)
 Cuvilly (60191)
 Cuy (60192)
 Dives (60198)
 Écuvilly (60204)
 Élincourt-Sainte-Marguerite (60206)
 Estrées-Saint-Denis (60223)
 Évricourt (60227)
 Le Fayel (60229)
 Flavy-le-Meldeux (60236)
 Francières (60254)
 Fréniches (60255)
 Fresnières (60258)
 Frétoy-le-Château (60263)
 Genvry (60270)
 Giraumont (60273)
 Golancourt (60278)
 Gournay-sur-Aronde (60281)
 Grandfresnoy (60284)
 Grandrû (60287)
 Guiscard (60291)
 Gury (60292)
 Hainvillers (60294)
 Hautefontaine (60305)
 Hémévillers (60308)
 Houdancourt (60318)
 Janville (60323)
 Jaulzy (60324)
 Jaux (60325)
 Jonquières (60326)
 Laberlière (60329)
 Lachelle (60337)
 Lacroix-Saint-Ouen (60338)
 Lagny (60340)
 Larbroye (60348)
 Lassigny (60350)
 Lataule (60351)
 Libermont (60362)
 Longueil-Annel (60368)
 Longueil-Sainte-Marie (60369)
 Machemont (60373)
 Marest-sur-Matz (60378)
 Mareuil-la-Motte (60379)
 Margny-aux-Cerises (60381)
 Margny-lès-Compiègne (60382)
 Margny-sur-Matz (60383)
 Marquéglise (60386)
 Maucourt (60389)
 Mélicocq (60392)
 Le Meux (60402)
 Monchy-Humières (60408)
 Mondescourt (60410)
 Montmacq (60423)
 Montmartin (60424)
 Morlincourt (60431)
 Mortemer (60434)
 Moulin-sous-Touvent (60438)
 Moyvillers (60441)
 Muirancourt (60443)
 Nampcel (60445)
 Neufvy-sur-Aronde (60449)
 La Neuville-sur-Ressons (60459)
 Noyon (60471)
 Ognolles (60474)
 Orvillers-Sorel (60483)
 Passel (60488)
 Pierrefonds (60491)
 Pimprez (60492)
 Le Plessis-Brion (60501)
 Plessis-de-Roye (60499)
 Le Plessis-Patte-d'Oie (60502)
 Pont-l'Évêque (60506)
 Pontoise-lès-Noyon (60507)
 Porquéricourt (60511)
 Quesmy (60519)
 Remy (60531)
 Ressons-sur-Matz (60533)
 Rethondes (60534)
 Ribécourt-Dreslincourt (60537)
 Ricquebourg (60538)
 Rivecourt (60540)
 Roye-sur-Matz (60558)
 Saint-Crépin-aux-Bois (60569)
 Saint-Étienne-Roilaye (60572)
 Saint-Jean-aux-Bois (60579)
 Saint-Léger-aux-Bois (60582)
 Saint-Pierre-lès-Bitry (60593)
 Saint-Sauveur (60597)
 Salency (60603)
 Sempigny (60610)
 Sermaize (60617)
 Solente (60621)
 Suzoy (60625)
 Thiescourt (60632)
 Thourotte (60636)
 Tracy-le-Mont (60641)
 Tracy-le-Val (60642)
 Trosly-Breuil (60647)
 Vandélicourt (60654)
 Varesnes (60655)
 Vauchelles (60657)
 Venette (60665)
 Vieux-Moulin (60674)
 Vignemont (60675)
 Ville (60676)
 Villers-sur-Coudun (60689)
 Villeselve (60693)

History

The arrondissement of Compiègne was created in 1800.

As a result of the reorganisation of the cantons of France which came into effect in 2015, the borders of the cantons are no longer related to the borders of the arrondissements. The cantons of the arrondissement of Compiègne were, as of January 2015:

 Attichy
 Compiègne-Nord
 Compiègne-Sud-Est
 Compiègne-Sud-Ouest
 Estrées-Saint-Denis
 Guiscard
 Lassigny
 Noyon
 Ressons-sur-Matz
 Ribécourt-Dreslincourt

References

Compiegne